UFC 287: Pereira vs. Adesanya 2 is an upcoming mixed martial arts event produced by the Ultimate Fighting Championship that will take place on April 8, 2023, at the Miami-Dade Arena in Miami, Florida, United States.

Background
The event will mark the promotion's second visit to Miami and first since UFC 42 in April 2003.

A UFC Middleweight Championship rematch between current champion Alex Pereira (also former Glory Middleweight and Light Heavyweight Champion) and former champion Israel Adesanya is expected to headline the event. The pairing previously met at UFC 281 in which Pereira captured the title by fifth round knockout. The two also previously met twice in kickboxing matchups. The first in April 2016 which Pereira won by unanimous decision. Their second meeting took place at Glory of Heroes 7 in March 2017 which Pereira won by third round knockout.

Fight card

See also 

 2023 in UFC
 List of current UFC fighters
 List of UFC events

References 

 

Ultimate Fighting Championship events
2023 in mixed martial arts
Scheduled mixed martial arts events
2023 in sports in Florida
April 2023 sports events in the United States